In aviation, usable fuel is the fuel on board an aircraft that can actually be used by its engines. The opposite of usable fuel is unusable fuel.

The unusable fuel figure is calculated for an aircraft fuel tank in "the most adverse fuel feed condition occurring under each intended operation and flight maneuver involving that tank".

The figure usable fuel is used when calculating or defining other key figures of an aircraft such as MTOW, zero-fuel weight etc.

Usable fuel is the total amount of fuel in an aircraft minus the fuel that cannot be fed into the engine(s): fuel under the pump-intake, fuel behind ribs of a tank, fuel in lines between the tanks and the engines etc. As this figure is calculated/defined for a plane in level flight it is possible that the engines of an aircraft run dry (out of fuel) even when the amount of usable fuel is still above zero, such as if the wings are not level and/or the angle of attack is higher or lower than when cruising. The inverse is also possible; in some conditions, fuel can continue to be fed to the engines when the usable fuel is below zero.

Although the term is mainly used in aviation it is sometimes also used for other craft with engines.

Sources and References

Aircraft operations